The 1999 French Open mixed doubles was the mixed event of the ninety-eighth edition of the French Open, the second Grand Slam of the year. Justin Gimelstob and Venus Williams were the defending champions, but they did not compete this year.

The unseeded pair of Piet Norval and Katarina Srebotnik won in the final over sixth seeds Rick Leach and Larisa Neiland, 6–3, 3–6, 6–3.

Seeds
All seeds receive a bye into the second round.

Draw

Finals

Top half

Section 1

Section 2

Bottom half

Section 3

Section 4

External links
1999 French Open – Doubles draws and results at the International Tennis Federation

Mixed Doubles
French Open by year – Mixed doubles